The Vyškov Gate is a geomorphological feature in the Moravia (Czech Republic). It is formed by the depression between the Western Carpathian Mountains in the east and the Bohemian massif (Drahanská vrchovina) in the west. The drainage divide between the upper River Haná to the River Morava of the Danube basin runs through it and Rakovec brook (in the Dyje–Svratka Vale). The gate is between the Upper Morava Vale (in the north-east) and the Dyje–Svratka Vale (in the south-west), all in Outer Subcarpathian depression.

Including low watershed (drainage divide) Na hanácké – 339 m

The Vyškov Gate has been a natural pass between the Bohemian-Moravian province (Bohemian Massif) – Bohemian-Moravian Highland and the Carpathians (Chřiby) since ancient times. Here ran the most important trade routes from southern Europe to the Baltic Sea (e.g. the Amber Road) and also routes from Moravia to Upper Silesia and Lesser Poland. Today the D1 motorway leads from the Moravian capital Brno to Ostrava, the centre of the Moravian-Silesian Region. The Austrian Northern Railway (one part) built in 1869 from Brno to Přerov and Ostrava also traversed the Vyškov Gate.

See also 
 South-Moravian Carpathians
 Moravian Gate
 Outer Subcarpathia

References

Mountain passes of the Czech Republic
Western Carpathians
Moravia